Ivanhoe railway station is located on the Broken Hill line in New South Wales, Australia. It serves the town of Ivanhoe.

History
Ivanhoe station opened on 19 August 1925 when the line was extended from Trida. It served as the terminus of the line until 7 November 1927 when it was extended to join with the line from Broken Hill.

The main town is located approximately three kilometres north of the station and from the original opening of the line a separate railway town was constructed adjacent the station to service the railways needs. Workshops, worker houses, locomotive depots, track maintenance depot, crew barracks, fuelling point and the station were all built. The railway town has now largely been taken over by the Ivanhoe Gaol.

Services
Ivanhoe is served by NSW TrainLink's weekly Outback Xplorer between Sydney and Broken Hill.

Journey Beyond's weekly Indian Pacific passes Ivanhoe but does not stop at the station.

References

External links

Ivanhoe station details Transport for New South Wales

Easy Access railway stations in New South Wales
Railway stations in Australia opened in 1925
Regional railway stations in New South Wales